Selkirk—Interlake—Eastman (formerly Selkirk—Interlake) is a federal electoral district in Manitoba, Canada, that has been represented in the House of Commons of Canada from 1976 to 1987, and since 1997.

The riding was a battleground between the New Democratic Party and conservative parties that has become more and more conservative as the years passed, and is now a safe Conservative Party seat.

Geography

The riding is located generally between Lake Winnipeg and Lake Winnipegosis and includes the northern suburbs of Winnipeg and the City of Selkirk, Manitoba. In addition to Selkirk, the riding includes the communities of St. Andrews, St. Clements, Rockwood, Woodlands, Brokenhead, Stonewall, R.M. of Gimli, and the R.M. of Bifrost.

Selkirk itself tilts toward the NDP, but it is not enough to overcome the growing conservative bent of the rest of the riding.

History

The electoral district was originally created in 1976 from the former districts of Portage, Selkirk and Winnipeg South Centre.

It was abolished in 1987 and divided into Selkirk, Portage—Interlake, Provencher, and Churchill ridings.

It was re-created in 1996 from Selkirk—Red River, Portage—Interlake, Provencher and Churchill.

Selkirk—Interlake lost territory to Churchill—Keewatinook Aski, Provencher and Portage—Lisgar, gained territory from Provencher, and was renamed "Selkirk—Interlake—Eastman" during the 2012 electoral redistribution.

Demographics
According to the Canada 2006 Census

Racial groups: 78.83% White, 20.12% Aboriginal 
Languages: 84.11% English, 1.99% French, 13.70% Other 
Religions (2001): 51.05% Protestant, 23.96% Catholic, 19.83% No religion, 3.13% Other Christian
Average income: $23,818

Riding associations
Riding associations are the local branches of the national political parties:

Members of Parliament
This riding has elected the following Members of Parliament:

Current Member of Parliament
Its Member of Parliament is James Bezan, a former rancher who was first elected in 2004. He is a member of the Conservative Party of Canada and has served as a member on the 'Standing Committee on Agriculture and Agri-Food'.

Election results

Selkirk—Interlake—Eastman, 2015–present

Selkirk—Interlake, 1997–2015

|- style="background:white;"

Note: Conservative vote is compared to the total of the Canadian Alliance vote and Progressive Conservative vote in 2000 election.

Note: Canadian Alliance vote is compared to the Reform vote in 1997 election.

Selkirk—Interlake, 1979–1988

See also
 List of Canadian federal electoral districts
 Past Canadian electoral districts

References

Notes

External links
 
 
 Expenditures - 2008
Expenditures - 2004
Expenditures - 2000
Expenditures - 1997

Selkirk, Manitoba
Manitoba federal electoral districts